The Șureanu Mountains, (German: Mühlbacher Gebirge, Hungarian: Kudzsiri-havasok), belong to Romania's Parâng range in the Southern Carpathians, with peaks frequently exceeding .

The mountains are located north of Romania's Jiu Valley, in the Hunedoara and Alba counties. They border the Cindrel Mountains to the east and the Lotru Mountains to the southeast. The Parâng Mountains are to the south, separated by the Jiul de Est River. To the west, across the Hațeg Depression and the Orăștie Corridor, lie the Retezat Mountains and the Poiana Ruscă Mountains, while to the north, across the Mureș River valley, lie the Apuseni Mountains.

The Șureanu Mountains are divided into the Sebeș Mountains to the east and the Orăștiei Mountains to the west.
as well as Aușelu, Comărnicelul, Gropșoara, and Pârva peaks. In the southern area of these mountains there is a limestone region with several caves, hills, and gorges.

The Șureanu Mountains are traversed by several rivers, mostly flowing north towards the Mureș. 
 The Pianul River has its source in Pianu commune.
 The Sebeș River starts from the Oașa Lake and separates the Șureanu and Cindrel mountains.
 The Strei River has its source above Baru commune.

Notes

Mountain ranges of Romania
Mountain ranges of the Southern Carpathians